The Martin 193 was a design for a giant cargo transport seaplane that was conceived in 1942 as part of the "Sky Freighter" concept for colossal flying boats that could carry large loads of troops and freight across the Atlantic Ocean in response to the sinking of Allied merchant ships by U-boats.

It was basically a 40% enlargement of the Martin JRM Mars, weighing 250,000 pounds at takeoff and featuring a longer hull and wingspan, being powered by six radial piston engines. No powerplant types were revealed.

The Martin 193 lost out to the Hughes H-4 Hercules, and after the end of World War II obviated the urgency for Sky Freighters. Martin considered a civilian version of the Model 193, but the airlines were uninterested.

See also

References

1940s United States military transport aircraft
Flying boats
Martin aircraft
Six-engined tractor aircraft